Meertens is a Dutch patronymic surname (son of Meerten/Maarten). It may refer to:

 Jacques Meertens (born 1948), Dutch clarinetist
 Lambert Meertens (born 1944), Dutch computer scientist
 Bird–Meertens formalism, Meertens number
 Piet Meertens (1899–1985), Dutch dialectologist and ethnologist
 Meertens Institute, research institute for Dutch language and culture

See also
 Mertens

Dutch-language surnames
Patronymic surnames
Surnames from given names